Conus bonfigliolii is a species of sea snail, a marine gastropod mollusc in the family Conidae, the cone snails and their allies.

Like all species within the genus Conus, these cone snails are predatory and venomous. They are capable of "stinging" humans, therefore live ones should be handled carefully or not at all.

Description
The size of the shell varies between 17 mm and 27 mm.

Distribution
This species occurs in the Indian Ocean off Southern Madagascar.

References

 Bozzetti L. (2010) Two new species of Conidae (Gastropoda: Prosobranchia: Conidae) from Southern Madagascar. Malacologia Mostra Mondiale 68: 3-5
 Puillandre N., Duda T.F., Meyer C., Olivera B.M. & Bouchet P. (2015). One, four or 100 genera? A new classification of the cone snails. Journal of Molluscan Studies. 81: 1-23

External links
 To Encyclopedia of Life
 To World Register of Marine Species
 
 Holotype in MHNH, Paris

bonfigliolii
Gastropods described in 2010